Furthermore is the fifth album led by saxophonist Ralph Moore which was recorded in 1989 and released on the Landmark label.

Reception 

In his review on AllMusic, Stephen Cook stated "Furthermore does not break the mold so much as provide a pleasurable listening experience of the highest order. A potential dinner party classic; subtle enough not to disturb the guests, but provocative enough to elicit comments".

Track listing 
All compositions by Ralph Moore except where noted
 "Hopscotch" – 7:56
 "Monk's Dream" (Thelonious Monk) – 7:57
 "3 1 0 Blues" – 8:04
 "Phoebe's Samba" (Benny Green) – 5:53
 "Girl Talk" (Neal Hefti) – 6:55
 "Into Dawn" (Roy Hargrove) – 7:40
 "Line D" – 4:15

Personnel 
Ralph Moore – tenor saxophone
Roy Hargrove – trumpet (tracks 1, 3, 4 & 6)
Benny Green – piano
Peter Washington – bass 
Victor Lewis (tracks 2, 4, 6 & 7), Kenny Washington (tracks 1, 3 & 5) – drums

References 

Ralph Moore albums
1990 albums
Landmark Records albums
Albums recorded at Van Gelder Studio
Albums produced by Orrin Keepnews